The following events occurred in Antarctica in 2022.

Events 
Ongoing: COVID-19 pandemic in Antarctica

 5 January - A Belgian scientific research station that was hit with a COVID-19 outbreak last month have since fully recovered.

 6 September - Scientists operating robotic submarines announce that the Thwaites Glacier may separate sooner than expected, with sea levels expected to rise by several meters.

References 

2022 in Antarctica
2020s in Antarctica
Years of the 21st century in Antarctica